Urolf (* / † unknown) was the seventh Bishop of Passau from about 804 to 806.

The Domstift could acquire several donations under his rule: Schärding, Machendorf, Schalchen and Andießen.

References

Year of birth unknown
806 deaths
Roman Catholic bishops of Passau
8th-century births
9th-century bishops in Bavaria